The Calloway County Courthouse is a courthouse in Murray, Kentucky built in 1913.  It was listed on the National Register of Historic Places in 1986.

It was the result of blatant election tampering, in which votes on bond authorization were falsified.  Voters had actually turned down the funding for a replacement to the previous courthouse which had burned in 1906.  Proponents of the new courthouse cheated to get what they wanted.
 
It is a three-story brick building designed in Classical Revival style

References

County courthouses in Kentucky
National Register of Historic Places in Calloway County, Kentucky
Neoclassical architecture in Kentucky
Government buildings completed in 1913
1913 establishments in Kentucky
Courthouses on the National Register of Historic Places in Kentucky
Murray, Kentucky